Katina may refer to
 Katina (name)
 Katina (Star Fox planet)
 Katina ceremony, a Buddhist festival
 Katina (film), 1942 US production with Jack Oakie and Sonja Henie, also known as Iceland
 Katina (island), an island in Croatia
Katina P, Greek oil tanker